David Origanus or David Tost (9 July 1558 – 11 July 1628/29) was a German astronomer and professor for Greek language and Mathematics at the Viadrina University in Frankfurt (Oder), where he had also studied.

Tost was born in Glatz (Kladsko), Bohemia (now Kłodzko in southern Poland). During his scientific career he observed numerous comets and published about Ephemeris in 1599 and 1609. In contrast to Tycho Brahe, he was convinced that the Earth rotates.  He died in Frankfurt (Oder), aged 71.

Works 
 Novae motuum coelestium ephemerides Brandenburgicae, Frankfurt aO: Eichornius, 1609, „Praefatio"
 Ephemerides Novae Annorum XXXVI, Incipientes Ab Anno ... 1595, Quo Joannis Stadii maxime aberrare incipiunt, & desinentes in annum 1630: Quibus praemissa est Introductio Seu Compendiaria Ephemeridum Enarratio ... Eichornius, 1599

Notes

External links

16th-century German astronomers
16th-century German mathematicians
People from Kłodzko
People from Austrian Silesia
European University Viadrina alumni
Academic staff of European University Viadrina
1558 births
1628 deaths
17th-century German astronomers